The Indo-Gangetic Plain, also known as the North Indian River Plain, is a  fertile plain encompassing northern regions of the Indian subcontinent, including most of northern and eastern India, around half of Pakistan, virtually all of Bangladesh and southern plains of Nepal. The region is named after the Indus and the Ganges rivers and encompasses a number of large urban areas. The plain is bound on the north by the Himalayas, which feed its numerous rivers and are the source of the fertile alluvium deposited across the region by the two river systems. The southern edge of the plain is marked by the Deccan Plateau. On the west rises the Iranian Plateau. Many developed cities like Delhi, Dhaka, Kolkata, Lahore and Karachi are located in the Indo-Gangetic Plain.

History
The region is known for the Indus Valley civilization, which was responsible for the birth of ancient culture of the Indian subcontinent. The flat and fertile terrain has facilitated the repeated rise and expansion of various empires, including the Maurya Empire, Kushan Empire, Gupta Empire, Pala Empire, Imperial Kannauj, Dogra Dynasty, Delhi Sultanates, the Mughal Empire and Maratha Empire – all of which had their demographic and political centers in the Indo-Gangetic plain. During the Vedic and Epic eras of Indian history, this region was referred to as "Aryavarta" (Land of the Aryans). According to Manusmṛti (2.22), 'Aryavarta' is "the tract between the Himalaya and the Vindhya ranges, from the Eastern Sea (Bay of Bengal) to the Western Sea (Arabian Sea)". The region is also referred to historically as "Hindustan" or the Land of the Hindus.

The name ‘Hindustan’ (हिन्दुस्तान) is Persian; it means literally ‘country of the Hindus/Indians’. Its first member, Hindu (हिन्दु), was borrowed from the Sanskrit word sindhu (सिन्धु) m./f. ‘river’, while stān is a cognate of the Sanskrit word sthāna (स्थान) n. ‘a place’.

The term was later used to refer to the whole of the Indian subcontinent. The term "Hindustani" is also used to refer to the people, music, and culture of the region.

In 12th Century Much of Indo-Gangetic Plain were ruled by the Rajputs. Most Prominent of them were Chauhans of Ajmer along with Gahadavals Or Rathores of Varanasi and many petty Rajput kingdoms. Rajput as a separate caste also emerge in Indian social structure around Ghurid Invasions of India.

In 1191, the Rajput king of Ajmer and Delhi, Prithviraj Chauhan, unified several Rajput states and decisively defeated the invading army of Shihabuddin Ghori near Tarroari in the First Battle of Tarain.

Shihabuddin returned, and in spite of being outnumbered, decisively defeated the Rajput Confederacy of Prithviraj on the same battlefield in the Second Battle of Tarain. Prithviraj fled the battleground but was captured shortly from battle site and executed. Malesi a Kachwaha Rajput of Jaipur lead last stand for Rajputs against Ghurids after Prithviraj escape.

The defeat of Rajputs marks a watershed moment in Medieval India's history as it not only shattered Rajput powers in the Indo-Gangetic Plain but also firmly established a Muslim presence.

Following the battle, the Delhi Sultanate became prominent in the region and collapse of organised Rajput resistance in northern India led to Muslim control of the region within a generation.

Geography

The Indo-Gangetic Plain is divided into two drainage basins by the Delhi Ridge; the western part drains to the Indus, and the eastern part consists of the Ganga–Brahmaputra drainage systems. This divide is only 350 metres above sea level, causing the perception that the Indo-Gangetic Plain appears to be continuous from Sindh in the west to Bengal and Assam in the east. 

A thin strip between the foothills of the Himalayas and the plain, the Bhabar is a region of porous ground consisting of boulders and pebbles that have washed down from the mountains. It is not suitable for crops and is forested. The streams disappear underground here.

Below the Bhabar lie the grasslands of Terai and Dooars.

The many tributaries of the Indus river and the Ganga river divide the plain into doabs, tongues of land that extend to where the tributaries meet. Close to the rivers is khadar land of new alluvium that is subject to flooding. Above the flood limit, bangar land is older alluvium deposited in the middle Pleistocene.

The annual rainfall increases from west towards the east. The Lower Ganges Plains and the Assam Valley are more verdant than the middle Ganga plain. The lower Ganga is centered in West Bengal, from which it flows into Bangladesh. After joining the Jamuna, a distributary of Brahmaputra, both rivers form the Ganges Delta. The Brahmaputra rises in Tibet as the Yarlung Zangbo River and flows through Arunachal Pradesh and Assam, before crossing into Bangladesh.

Some geographers subdivide the Indo-Gangetic Plain into several parts: the Gujarat, Sindh, Punjab, Doab, Rohilkhand, Awadh, Bihar, Bengal and Assam regions.

Roughly, the Indo-Gangetic Plain stretches across:
 the Jammu Plains in the north;
 the Punjab Plains in eastern Pakistan and northwestern India;
 the Sindh Plains in southern Pakistan;
 the Indus Delta in southern Pakistan and western India;
 the Ganga-Yamuna Doab;
 the Rohilkhand (Katehr) Plains;
 the Awadh Plains;
 the Purvanchal Plains;
 the Bihar Plains;
 the North Bengal plains;
 the Ganges Delta in India and Bangladesh;
 and the Brahmaputra Valley in the east.

The fertile Terai region is spread across Southern Nepal and Northern India along the foothills of the Himalayas. The rivers encompassed are the Beas, the Chambal, the Chenab, the Ganga, the Gomti, the Indus, the Ravi, the Sutlej and the Yamuna. The soil is rich in silt, making the plain one of the most intensely farmed areas of the world. Even rural areas here are densely populated.

The Indus–Ganga plains, also known as the "Great Plains", are large floodplains of the Indus, Ganga and the Brahmaputra river systems. They run parallel to the Himalaya mountains, from Jammu and Kashmir and Khyber Pakhtunkhwa in the west to Assam in the east and draining most of Northern and Eastern India. The major rivers of this system are the Ganga and the Indus along with their tributaries; Beas, Yamuna, Gomti, Ravi, Chambal, Sutlej and Chenab.

The Indus-Ganga belt is the world's most extensive expanse of uninterrupted alluvium formed by the deposition of silt by the numerous rivers. The plains are flat and mostly treeless, making it conducive for irrigation through canals. The area is also rich in ground water sources. The plains are the world's most intensely farmed areas. The main crops grown are rice and wheat that are grown in rotation. Others include maize, sugarcane and cotton. The Indo-Gangetic plains rank among the world's most densely populated areas with a total population exceeding 400 million.

Fauna
Until recent history, the open grasslands of the Indus-Ganga Plain were inhabited by several large species of animal. The open plains were home to large numbers of herbivores which included all three of the Asian rhinoceros (Indian rhinoceros, Javan rhinoceros, Sumatran rhinoceros). The open grasslands were in many ways similar to the landscape of modern Africa. Gazelle, buffalo, rhinos, elephants, lions, and hippo roamed the grasslands as they do in Africa today. Large herds of Indian elephants, gazelles, antelopes and horses lived alongside several species of wild cattle including the now-extinct aurochs. In the forested areas there were several species of wild pig, deer and muntjac. In the wetter regions close to the Ganga, there would have been large herds of water buffalo grazing on the riverbanks along with extinct species of hippopotamus.

So many large animals would have supported a large population of predators as well. Indian wolves, dholes, striped hyenas, Asiatic cheetahs and Asiatic lions would have hunted large game on the open plains, while Bengal tigers and leopards would stalk prey in the surrounding woods and sloth bears hunt for termites in both of these areas. In the Ganges there were large concentrations of gharial, mugger crocodile and river dolphin controlling fish stocks and the occasional migrating herd crossing the river.

Agriculture
Farming on the Indus-Ganga Plain primarily consists of rice and wheat grown in crop rotation. Other crops include maize, millets, barley, sugarcane, and cotton.

The main source of rainfall is the southwest monsoon which is normally sufficient for general agriculture. The many rivers flowing out of the Himalayas provide water for major irrigation works.

Due to a rapidly growing population (as well as other factors), this area is considered at high risk for water shortages in the future.

The area constitutes the land between the Brahmaputra River and the Aravalli Range. The Ganga and other rivers such as the Yamuna, the Ghaghara and the Chambal River flow through the area.

Administrative divisions
Because it is not fully possible to define the boundaries of the Indo-Gangetic Plain, it is also difficult to give an exact list of which administrative areas are part of the plain.

The areas that are completely or more than half in the plain are:
Bangladesh (Excluding the Chittagong Hill Tracts)
Bhutan (Only southern fringes of the country bordering India)
India
Arunachal Pradesh (The southern fringes bordering Assam)
Assam (The Brahmaputra and Barak Valley)
Bihar (Almost entirely)
Chandigarh
Delhi (Almost entirely)
Haryana
Himachal Pradesh (Una district and the southern fringes bordering Punjab and Haryana)
Jammu and Kashmir (3 southernmost districts of the Jammu Division)
Madhya Pradesh (Gird Region Including the Chambal division)
Punjab
Rajasthan (Sri Ganganagar and Hanumangarh districts)
Uttarakhand (Terai Region encompassing Haridwar and Udham Singh Nagar districts)
Uttar Pradesh (Excluding the Chitrakoot division)
West Bengal (Excluding the Darjeeling Himalayan hill region)
Nepal
Nepalese Terai
Pakistan
Balochistan (Kacchi Plains)
Punjab (Excluding Salt Range and Cholistan desert)
Sindh (Excluding the Kirthar Range and the Thar desert)
Khyber Pakhtunkhwa (Derajat region and the Peshawar Valley)

See also
 Doab
 Āryāvarta
 Ecoregions: Lower and Upper Gangetic Plains moist deciduous forests, Terai-Duar savanna and grasslands, Northwestern thorn scrub forest.

References

Bibliography
 
 

Plains of India
Plains of Pakistan
Plains of Nepal
Plains of Bangladesh
Plains of Asia